The 1960–61 season was the 69th season in Liverpool F.C.'s existence and their seventh season in Division Two. This was Bill Shankly's second season as manager and first full season at the club. The rebuilding of the club continued with them ending third in the table and being knocked out early in the FA Cup and the newly formed Football League Cup.

Squad

Goalkeepers
  Jim Furnell
  Bert Slater

Defenders
  Gerry Byrne
  Phil Ferns
  Alan Jones
  John Nicholson
  John Molyneux
  Ronnie Moran
  Dick White

Midfielders
  Alan A'Court
  Ian Callaghan
  Bobby Campbell
  Tommy Leishman
  James Harrower
  Jimmy Melia
  Gordon Milne
  Johnny Morrissey
  Billy Liddell

Forwards
  Alan Arnell
  Alf Arrowsmith
  Alan Banks
  Willie Carlin
  Roger Hunt
  Dave Hickson
  Kevin Lewis
  Gordon Wallace
  Johnny Wheeler

Table

Results

Second Division

FA Cup

Football League Cup

References
 LFC History.net – 1960-61 season
 Liverweb - 1960-61 Season

Liverpool F.C. seasons
Liverpool